Jornal o Cidadão (lit. Newspaper The Citizen) is a weekly newspaper published in Mindelo, in the island of São Vicente, Cape Verde. It is one of the most important newspapers in Cape Verde. It was founded in 1988.

Information
Jornal o Cidadão features sports, weather, businesses and more from the island as well as from Cape Verde. It features pages about news stories, newspaper pictures and sports online.

Editors
João Branco, theatrical actor - theatrical stories including upcoming plays at the time

External links
Jornal O Cidadãos official website

See also

List of companies in Cape Verde
Newspapers in Cape Verde

Newspapers published in Cape Verde
Mass media in Mindelo
1988 establishments in Cape Verde